TTX Company (formerly TrailerTrain) is a provider of railcars and related freight car management services to the North American rail industry. TTX's pool of railcars—over 168,000 cars and intermodal well cars—supports shippers in several industries where flatcars, boxcars and gondolas are required.

History
TTX was founded as TrailerTrain in 1955 by Norfolk & Western Railway, Pennsylvania Railroad, and Rail-Trailer Corporation. Pennsylvania Railroad employees—6,000 in total—entered possible names in a drawing for the new company, and the name "Trailer Train" won. TrailerTrain's original goals were to standardize TOFC railcar practices, foster the growth of transportation, provide its members with the best available equipment at the lowest cost, and keep its members abreast of new developments. In 1991, the company changed its company name from TrailerTrain to TTX.

TTX operates under pooling authority granted by the Surface Transportation Board. The flatcar pool was first approved in 1974 and then reauthorized in 1989, 1994, 2004, and most recently on October 1, 2014, for a 15-year term.

Fleet
TTX's railcar fleet consists of flatcars, autoracks, boxcars and gondolas. Half of the fleet is dedicated to flatcars and intermodal wells, with a quarter dedicated to auto racks for hauling finished vehicles. The remaining quarter of the pool includes boxcars, gondolas, and specialized flatcars to carry various general merchandise commodities. TTX provides standardized car types and re-purposes idle assets to serve a dynamic marketplace.

The fleet is maintained through a network of independent repair facilities, TTX-owned Field Maintenance Operations (FMOs) located at intermodal terminals throughout North America, and TTX-owned heavy repair shops located in:
 Jacksonville, Florida
 North Augusta, South Carolina
 Waterford Township, Michigan
 Mira Loma, California

Ownership
TTX is privately owned by North America's railroads and is the industry's railcar cooperative. The major railroads listed below all own shares of the company, with a voting member from each railroad making up the TTX Board of Directors.

 Burlington Northern Santa Fe
 Canadian National
 Canadian Pacific
 CSX Corporation
 Ferromex
 Kansas City Southern Railway
 Norfolk Southern Railway
 Pan Am Railways
 Union Pacific

Logo

Between 1991 and 2008, the company used a yellow and black logo with speed lines connecting the two T's and an X.

In March 2008, the company released a new logo, colored Tuscan red, in honor of one of the founding railroads, the Pennsylvania Railroad.

See also 
 List of rolling stock manufacturers
 Rail terminology

References

External links

 

1955 establishments in Pennsylvania
BNSF Railway
Canadian National Railway
Canadian Pacific Railway
CSX Transportation
Kansas City Southern Railway
Norfolk Southern Railway
Pan Am Railways
Privately held companies based in Illinois
Rolling stock leasing companies
Rolling stock manufacturers of the United States
Transport companies established in 1955
Union Pacific Railroad